Humne Jeena Seekh Liya (English: We Have Learned To Live) is a 2008 Indian coming of age drama and comedy film directed by  Milind Ukey and starring Siddharth Chandekar, and Mrunmayee Deshpande. It was first released on 4 January 2008.

Plot 
Humne Jeena Seekh Liya  is adapted from a Marathi novel titled Shaala (School), and is a coming of age story of four school friends.

Ashwin (Siddharth Chandekar), Lochya (Omkar Bhatkar), Vankat and Salman (Pratik Shelar) are inseparable friends at the New English School. They are experiencing the onset of adulthood through teenage crushes, difficult teachers, and social upheavals in the news. They want to be a different generation, but have few clues as to what or how to change the world.

Cast 

Siddharth Chandekar as Ashwin Joshi
Mrunmayee Deshpande as Pari
Girish Oak as Manohar Joshi
Reema Lagoo as Mrs Joshi,Ashwin Mother
Priya Marathe as Rani Joshi
Milind Gunaji as Professor Kulkarni.
Rekha Rao as Ghamadia Teacher
Shrivallabh Vyas as School Principal 
Raju Kher as Mr Sharma
Gaurav Chopra as Vijay,Social Activist
Pratik Shelar as Salman
Rajsingh Verma as rajmama alias Love Guru
Rutuja Shinde as Mohini
Omkar Bhatkar as Lochya
Ganesh Yadav as Lochya's father

Soundtrack 
Bandhan Sabhi Tod Ke Kailash Kher
Garajwa Ko Bhaye Kailash Kher, Sunidhi Chauhan
Oh Priya Sunidhi Chauhan
Thoda Sa Kar De Karam Shaan, Sunidhi Chauhan

References

External links 

Films shot in Mumbai
2008 films
2000s Hindi-language films